Pilot Mountain is a town in Surry County, North Carolina, United States. The population was 1,443 at the 2020 census. It is named for the nearby landmark of Pilot Mountain, a distinctive geological formation. It is believed to be the inspiration for the fictional town of Mount Pilot on The Andy Griffith Show and Mayberry RFD. On the first Saturday of every month, Pilot Mountain hosts one of it’s staples during the summer months, it’s monthly cruise-in and car show. Starting in the mid 2000’s, this has become one of the larger car shows in the Triad and in Northwestern North Carolina. Cars line up and down Main Street to gather to have fun. Food trucks, live bands with beach music, and downtown stores are all open during the shows that run from May to October. Old cars, trucks, motorcycles, muscle cars, and street rods are welcome to the event. The schedule for dates and bands can be found below
https://www.hotnightshotcars.com/2019-band-info/

History
The Bank of Pilot Mountain was listed on the National Register of Historic Places in 1997.

Geography
Pilot Mountain is located at  (36.384407, -80.469083).

Demographics

2020 census

As of the 2020 United States census, there were 1,440 people, 715 households, and 455 families residing in the town.

2000 census
As of the census of 2000, there were 1,281 people, 585 households, and 363 families residing in the town. The population density was 742.3 people per square mile (285.9/km). There were 644 housing units at an average density of 373.2 per square mile (143.7/km). The racial makeup of the town was 87.82% White, 9.29% African American, 0.16% Native American, 0.47% Asian, 0.86% from other races, and 1.41% from two or more races. Hispanic or Latino of any race were 1.25% of the population.

There were 585 households, out of which 25.5% had children under the age of 18 living with them, 45.3% were married couples living together, 14.7% had a female householder with no husband present, and 37.8% were non-families. 34.5% of all households were made up of individuals, and 15.7% had someone living alone who was 65 years of age or older. The average household size was 2.19 and the average family size was 2.81.

In the town, the population was spread out, with 22.5% under the age of 18, 7.3% from 18 to 24, 27.3% from 25 to 44, 23.7% from 45 to 64, and 19.2% who were 65 years of age or older. The median age was 40 years. For every 100 females, there were 79.9 males. For every 100 females age 18 and over, there were 75.4 males.

The median income for a household in the town was $33,529, and the median income for a family was $42,279. Males had a median income of $31,522 versus $21,250 for females. The per capita income for the town was $18,526. About 11.9% of families and 15.5% of the population were below the poverty line, including 25.1% of those under age 18 and 17.2% of those age 65 or over.

References

External links
 Official Town Site
 Atlantic & Yadkin Railway

Towns in Surry County, North Carolina
Towns in North Carolina